Ludwig Schwabe (June 24, 1835 – February 20, 1908) was a German classical philologist and professor of classical archaeology born in Giessen.

He studied classical philology and archaeology at the Universities of Giessen and Göttingen, receiving his doctorate in 1857 at Giessen. In 1863 he became an associate professor at Giessen, and soon afterwards relocated to the University of Dorpat as a professor of classical philology. In 1872 he was appointed professor of classical philology and chair of classical archaeology at the University of Tübingen, where in 1881–82 he was university rector.

Literary works 
Among his better written works was an influential examination of the Roman poet Catullus titled Quaestiones Catullianae (1862), and a revision of Wilhelm Siegmund Teuffel's Geschichte der römischen Literatur (1882). Other noted publications by Schwabe include:
 Ludovici Schwabii In Cirin carmen Observationes pars I, 1871
 Zu Plautus Menaechmen, 1872
 Ludovici Schwabii de Musaeo Nonni imitator liber, 1876
 Pergamon und seine Kunst, 1882
 Die kaiserlichen Dezennalien und die alexandrinischen Münzen, 1896

References 
 Translated biography at Meyers Konversations-Lexikon
 Open Library (list of publications)
 Krmnicek, S. 2017. Ludwig Schwabe und das Archäologische Institut. In: P. Baas, S. Krmnicek and J. Lipps (eds) Klassische Archäologie im Wandel. Zum 150-jährigen Bestehen des Tübinger Instituts. Tübinger Archäologische Forschungen Sonderschriften 1. Rahden/Westf.: Marie Leidorf, 67-76.

German classical philologists
People from Giessen
Academic staff of the University of Tartu
Academic staff of the University of Tübingen
1835 births
1908 deaths
University of Giessen alumni
University of Göttingen alumni
Place of birth missing